One Hour to Live is a 1939 American crime film directed by Harold D. Schuster and written by Roy Chanslor. The film stars Charles Bickford, Doris Nolan, John Litel, Samuel S. Hinds, Paul Guilfoyle and Robert Emmett Keane. The film was released on November 10, 1939, by Universal Pictures.

Plot

Cast        
Charles Bickford as Inspector Sid Brady
Doris Nolan as Muriel Vance
John Litel as Rudolph Spain
Samuel S. Hinds as Commissioner Cromwell
Paul Guilfoyle as Stanley Jones
Robert Emmett Keane as Max Stanton
John Gallaudet as Jimmy March
Emory Parnell as Fats Monohan
Jack Carr as Rikki Renoir / Tiger Renoir

References

External links
 

1939 films
1930s English-language films
American crime films
1939 crime films
Universal Pictures films
Films directed by Harold D. Schuster
American black-and-white films
1930s American films